This article contains a comprehensive collection of information related to recordings by American pianist Mike Garson.

Solo albums
 1979: Avant Garson
 1982: Jazzical
 1986: Serendipity
 1989: Remember Love
 1990: The Mystery Man
 1990: Oxnard Sessions, Vol.1
 1992: A Gershwin Fantasia
 1992: Oxnard Sessions, Vol.2
 1998: Now! Music (Volume IV)
 2003: Homage to My Heroes
 2008: Conversations with My Family
 2008: Lost in Conversation
 2008: Mike Garson's Jazz Hat
 2011: The Bowie Variations
 2012: Wild Out West
 2016: Monk Fell On Me
 2020: Unleashed Volumes 1-6

Solo EPs
 2006: Contemplation
 2006: Part of the Whole
 2007: Anxcity
 2007: Hope in Forgotten Places

Free Flight albums
 1984: Beyond the Clouds
 1986: Illumination
 1988: Slice of Life
 1999: Free Flight 2000
 2002: A Free Flight Christmas
 2012: Free Flight Forevor

With David Bowie
 1973: Aladdin Sane
 1973: Pin Ups
 1974: David Live
 1974: Diamond Dogs
 1975: Young Americans
 1983: Ziggy Stardust - The Motion Picture
 1993: Black Tie White Noise
 1993: The Buddha of Suburbia
 1995: Santa Monica '72
 1995: Outside
 1997: Earthling [US]
 2000: Bowie at the Beeb
 2003: Reality
 2004: Hours (2004 bonus track)
 2009: VH1 Storytellers (David Bowie album)
 2010: A Reality Tour (album)
 2014: Nothing Has Changed - The Very Best of Bowie
 2015: David Bowie - Five Years (1969-1973)
 2016: David Bowie - Who Can I Be Now? (1974-1976)
 2018: Glastonbury 2000
 2020: I'm Only Dancing: Soul Tour '74

With Mick Ronson
 1974: Slaughter on 10th Avenue 
 1975: Play Don't Worry

With Stan Getz
 1980: Stan Getz Live
 1994: Stan Getz & Colleagues
 1999: Stan Getz Is Jazz – Live by the Sea

With Stanley Clarke
 1977: I Wanna Play for You
 1978: Modern Man

With Jim Walker
 1983: Flight of the Dove
 1983: Reflections
 1997: Walker & Garson Play Gershwin
 2000: Tranquility
 2007: Jim Walker Plays the Music of Mike Garson
 2010: Pied Piper
 2012: The Music of George Gershwin

With Billy Corgan
 1999: Stigmata

With Smashing Pumpkins
 2000: MACHINA/The Machines of God
 2000: Machina II/The Friends & Enemies of Modern Music (2000)
 2023: ATUM: A Rock Opera in Three Acts

With Nine Inch Nails
1999: The Fragile

With Mr Averell
2013: Gridlock

Participations
 1970: Brethren - Brethren
 1971: Brethren - Moment of Truth
 1971: Annette Peacock - Bley / Peacock Synthesizer Show
 1972: Annette Peacock - I'm the One
 1973: Lulu (aka: The Man Who Sold the World)
 1973: Open Sky - Open Sky
 1975: Bob Sargeant - First Starring Role
 1975: David Essex - All The Fun of the Fair
 1977: Paul Horn - Riviera Concert
 1988: Guy Pastor - It's Magic
 1991: Mike Garson and Los Gatos - Admiration
 1991: Brian Bromberg - It's About Time - The Acoustic Project
 1993: Jazz at the Movies Band - Man & A Woman, Sax at the Movies
 1994: Jazz at the Movies Band - Reel Romance
 1994: Robin Williamson - Love & Parting & Five Bardic Mysteries
 1995: People from Bad Homes - Ava Cherry & Astronettes: People from Bad Homes
 1997: Jazz at the Movies Band - Sax on Broadway
 1998: Yamaha - Flute - Contemporary Virtuosos
 1998: Seal - Human Being
 1999: C. Gibbs - Twenty Nine over Me
 2000: No Doubt - Return of Saturn
 2003: Raphaël Haroche - La Réalité
 2005: Raphaël Haroche - Caravane
 2005: Jimmy Chamberlin Complex - Life Begins Again (bonus tracks)
 2006: Something for Kate - Desert Lights
 2007: Annie Clark/St Vincent - Marry Me
 2007: Polyphonic Spree - The Fragile Army
 2007: Raphaël Haroche - Live - Une Nuit Au Châtelet
 2007: Emma Burgess - Swim
 2008: Juno Reactor - Gods and Monsters
 2008: Aviv Geffen - Live 08
 2008: Sibyl Vane - The Locked Suitcase
 2009: Sleepyard - Future Lines
 2010: Melissa Auf der Maur - Out of Our Minds
 2010: Dillinger Escape Plan - Option Paralysis
 2014 Sleepyard - Black Sails
 2014 Gone Girl (Soundtrack from the Motion Picture)
 2022 The Pretty Reckless – Other Worlds

External links
 Mike Garson official website
 Discography at discogs.com

Discographies of American artists
Jazz discographies